Doering is a surname. Notable people with the surname include:

Aaron Doering (born 1971), American professor
Bernd von Doering (1903–1944), German general
Charles R. Doering (born 1956), American professor
Chris Doering (born 1973), American football player
Jason Doering (born 1978), American football player
Jadwiga Doering (born 1938), Polish sprint canoer
Joe Doering (born 1982), American wrestler
Jordan Doering (born 1979), Australian rules footballer 
Lothar Doering (born 1950), East German handball player
María Helena Doering (born 1962), Colombian actress and model
Mavis Doering (1929–2007), Cherokee Nation basketmaker 
Travis Doering (born 1991), Canadian systems analyst, writer and film producer
William von Eggers Doering (1917–2011), American chemist